Strange Triangle is a 1946 American crime film noir directed by Ray McCarey and starring Signe Hasso, Preston Foster and Anabel Shaw.

Premise
A bank examiner becomes involved with a couple planning embezzlement, which leads them to murder.

Cast
 Signe Hasso as Francine Huber  Mathews
 Preston Foster as Sam Crane
 Anabel Shaw as Betty Wilson
 Shepperd Strudwick as Earl Huber a.k.a. Mathews
 Roy Roberts as Harry Matthews
 Emory Parnell as Barney Shaefer
 Nancy Evans as Hilda Shaefer

References

External links
 
 
 
 
 

1946 films
1940s crime thriller films
American crime thriller films
American black-and-white films
Film noir
Films directed by Ray McCarey
Films scored by David Buttolph
20th Century Fox films
1940s English-language films
1940s American films